Yondi Schmidt (born 26 April 1987) is a Dutch male  track cyclist, riding for the national team. He competed in the sprint and team sprint events at the 2009 and 2010 UCI Track Cycling World Championships.

References

External links
 
 
 
 
  

1987 births
Living people
Dutch track cyclists
Dutch male cyclists
Cyclists from Rotterdam
20th-century Dutch people
21st-century Dutch people